John Reed is an American former Negro league outfielder who played in the 1930s.

Reed played for the St. Louis Stars and the Indianapolis Athletics in 1937, then went on to play two seasons with the Chicago American Giants. In 21 recorded career games, he posted 14 hits and seven RBI in 61 plate appearances.

References

External links
 and Seamheads

Year of birth missing
Place of birth missing
Chicago American Giants players
Indianapolis Athletics players
St. Louis Stars (baseball) players
Baseball outfielders